The New Century Family Money Book is a 1993 financial security self-help book by Jonathan D. Pond. It was first published on March 1, 1993, through Dell Publishing and covers topics such as home ownership, college, investing, careers, insurance, retirement, and income tax and estate planning.

The Chicago Sun-Times gave a positive review for the book upon its release and noted that it "covers every personal and family financial concern from basic investing to college aid formulas".

References

1993 non-fiction books
Self-help books